David Brandt may refer to:

 David Brandt (American football) (born 1977), former American football offensive lineman
 David Brandt (politician), politician from Montserrat
 Dave Brandt, American soccer coach